Birgitta Haukdal Brynjarsdóttir (born 28 July 1979), also known by her mononym Birgitta, is an Icelandic singer. She rose to domestic media prominence as the lead singer of pop band Írafár. She represented Iceland in the Eurovision Song Contest 2003 with the song "Open Your Heart", tying in eighth place with the Spanish contestant Beth with 81 points.

Life and career 
For most of her life she has lived in the northern part of Iceland. In November 1999, Birgitta replaced the then lead vocalist of the pop group Írafár. They released their first single "Hvar er ég?" ("Where am I?") in the summer of 2000, followed by two more singles in 2001. The band signed a recording contract with Iceland's biggest record company, Skífan in 2002, releasing their first album "Allt sem ég sé" ("All I see") in early November. It is Iceland's fastest selling pop album of the last 25 years, reaching platinum - which is not common in Iceland.

, Birgitta Haukdal is one of the most popular female pop vocalists in Iceland. She has been voted Pop Star of the Year and Performer of the Year. In 2003, she won the national final for the Eurovision Song Contest 2003  with her song "Segðu mér allt". At the contest, she sang the English–language version of the song, "Open Your Heart", placing eighth with 81 points.

She competed in the Icelandic pre-qualifying for the Eurovision Song Contest 2006, with the song "Mynd Af Þér" or "Picture of you" and, in a duo with Magni Ásgeirsson, reached the finals of the Icelandic qualifying for Eurovision Song Contest 2008 with the song, "Núna veit ég" but did not win.

In 2013, she once again tried her luck in Söngvakeppni. This time, her entry was called Meðal Andanna.

Personal life 
Birgitta married her long–term boyfriend Benedikt Einarsson on 23 October 2008 in Reykjavík.

Awards and nominations

See also 
 Eurovision Song Contest 2003
 Iceland in the Eurovision Song Contest
 Iceland in the Eurovision Song Contest 2003
 Iceland in the Eurovision Song Contest 2006
 Iceland in the Eurovision Song Contest 2008

References

External links 
 Official Website of the Írafár

1979 births
Birgitta Haukdal
Eurovision Song Contest entrants of 2003
Birgitta Haukdal
Living people
21st-century Icelandic women singers